Mushayrib (also spelled Musheireb) is a district in Qatar, located in the municipality of Ad Dawhah. As of the 2010 census, the former district of Al Asmakh has been integrated into Mushayrib. It is one of the oldest districts of Doha, and contains Al Kahraba Street (also called Electricity Street), the country's first fully lit street.

History
In J. G. Lorimer's Gazetteer of the Persian Gulf first published in 1908, Mushayrib was described as a place where the town of Al Bidda obtained its water supply from, but described the water as brackish and scanty. Lorimer noted that it appeared to accommodate one of the only seven sizable date palm plantations in Qatar.

The majority of Mushayrib's residents are expat workers. In 2014, the government forcibly evicted several hundred residents from the neighborhood in preparation for the development of several new up-scale buildings and the demolition of older buildings.

Localities

Al Asmakh
Formerly a stand-alone district, Al Asmakh has been amalgamated into Mushayrib since the 21st century.  Al Asmakh was initially recognized as a formal district of Doha around the 1930s. Located near Souq Waqif, it covers an area of about 326,000 sq m2. Although most of its historic architecture has been degraded or demolished, there remains some standing buildings which date back to the early 20th century. Currently, it is populated mainly by migrant workers. Residential housing in the area is tightly packed and the streets are relatively narrow.

Msheireb Downtown Doha

The Msheireb Downtown Doha project was launched in January 2010 with the end goal of a complete overhaul and refurbishment of the district.

Transport
The underground Msheireb station serves the Doha Metro's Red Line, Green Line and Gold Line. Launched in May 2019, it is the country's largest metro station. It is located in Msheireb Downtown Doha, at the intersection of Wadi Msheireb and Al Diwan Street.

Demographics
As of the 2010 census, the district comprised 6,745 housing units and 1,009 establishments. There were 22,711 people living in the district, of which 83% were male and 17% were female. Out of the 22,711 inhabitants, 88% were 20 years of age or older and 12% were under the age of 20.

Employed persons made up 79% of the total population. Females accounted for 4% of the working population, while males accounted for 96% of the working population.

Gallery

References

Communities in Doha